Spun's Gallery, formerly known as Span's Cultural Gallery, is a museum in Bangkok focusing on historical Thai costumes and fashions. It was established by Sapan Thianprasit, a 1950s socialite with a personal interest in fashion. The museum was previously located near Soi 62, Phahonyothin Road in Sai Mai District, but has been moved to a new place inside Charter International School in Prawet District.

References

Museums in Bangkok
Art museums and galleries in Thailand